The Advanced Television Systems Committee (ATSC) is an international nonprofit organization developing technical standards for digital terrestrial television and data broadcasting. ATSC's 120-plus member organizations represent the broadcast, broadcast equipment, motion picture, consumer electronics, computer, cable, satellite and semiconductor industries.

ATSC was initially formed in 1983 to develop a first-generation digital television standard that could replace existing analog transmission systems. The new digital system became known as "ATSC 1.0."  ATSC 1.0 is in use in the United States, Canada, Mexico, South Korea and Honduras and also in the Dominican Republic.

ATSC then developed a next-generation digital television standard known as "ATSC 3.0.” ATSC 3.0 was commercially deployed in South Korea in May 2017  and was approved for voluntary use in the United States in November 2017.

See also
 ATSC tuner

References

External links
 ATSC standards download page

ATSC
Digital television
High-definition television
MPEG
Standards organizations in the United States
Television transmission standards
Organizations established in 1982
1982 establishments in the United States